John Robert Dowse ( – 20 October 1892) was Dean of Ferns from 1879 until his death.

He was born in Wexford, the son of Richard Dowse. He attended Trinity College Dublin, earning his BA in 1838 and MA in 1879.

His youngest son Charles Dowse was an Anglican  bishop in the first half of the 20th century.

Notes

Alumni of Trinity College Dublin
Deans of Ferns
1810s births
1892 deaths
Date of birth missing